Arnold Indalecio Palacios (born August 22, 1955) is a Northern Marianan politician currently serving as the tenth governor of the Northern Mariana Islands, since 2023. He previously served as the 12th lieutenant governor of the Northern Mariana Islands, from 2019 to 2023. He represented Saipan in the Northern Mariana Islands Senate. Formerly a member of the Republican Party, he is the governor of the Northern Mariana Islands, having won the 2022 election.

Personal life 
Palacios graduated from Portland State University. Palacios is married to Wella Sablan Palacios and they have four children: Arnold Gerard, Nicole, Tiana and Eric.

Political career 
Palacios is a former Speaker of the Northern Mariana Islands House of Representatives. He was sworn in on January 14, 2008, as the Speaker of the House's 16th Legislature. He represented Election District 3 in the House, which encompasses portions of Saipan and the Northern Islands.

Palacios was the running mate of four-time gubernatorial candidate Heinz Hofschneider in the 2009 election. If elected, Palacios would have become the Lieutenant Governor of the Northern Mariana Islands in 2010. Instead, he was elected in 2018 with incumbent Governor Ralph Torres to begin a term in January 2019.

Palacios won as an independent candidate for Governor in the 2022 election, running with Saipan mayor David M. Apatang as his running-mate.

See also
List of party switchers in the United States

References

External links

|-

|-

|-

 

 

Living people
Cabinet secretaries of the Northern Mariana Islands
Governors of the Northern Mariana Islands
Lieutenant Governors of the Northern Mariana Islands
Republican Party (Northern Mariana Islands) politicians
Speakers of the Northern Mariana Islands House of Representatives
Portland State University alumni
People from Saipan
Republican Party governors of the Northern Mariana Islands
Year of birth missing (living people)